Yantian Express is a Hapag-Lloyd Hamburg Express-class container ship, delivered in 2002. She was constructed by Hyundai Heavy Industries in Ulsan, South Korea, a measures , and delivered under the name Berlin Express but soon renamed Shanghai Express.

As of December 2022, other Hamburg Express class ships included Hamburg Express, New York Express, Basle Express, Hong Kong Express, Essen Express, Antwerpen Express, Leverkusen Express, Ludwigshafen Express, and Ulsen Express.

As Shanghai Express, the ship was featured in an episode of Mighty Ships on The Discovery Channel in 2004.

Incidents 
On 3 January 2019 the Yantian Express suffered from a fire event aboard. The ship was en route from Colombo (Sri Lanka) to Halifax when the fire broke out about 800 nm from the Canadian coast. All 23 seamen were evacuated on 7 January 2019 by the tow-boat "Smit Nicobar". 7 days after the fire broke out the salvage team was able to bring the fire under control and bring back 5 seaman aboard the ship.

On 25 January 2019 the vessel's operators, Hapag-Lloyd, declared General Average and placed stakeholders in the ship and its cargo on notice for liability for salvage costs.

Also on 25 January 2019 the Yantain Express got underway on her own power  en route to her port of refuge, Freeport, Bahamas.

References

External links
Shanghai Express photo
more photos

2001 ships
Container ships
Ships built by Hyundai Heavy Industries Group